The Colorado State Patrol (CSP) (originally known as the Colorado State Highway Courtesy Patrol), based in Lakewood, Colorado, is a division of the Colorado Department of Public Safety, and is one of the official state patrol agencies of Colorado, along with the Colorado Bureau of Investigation and several smaller state agencies.  The CSP primarily enforces traffic laws on interstates and state highways, guards the state capitol and the Governor of Colorado.

History
Senate Bill No. 6 in 1935 created the Colorado State Highway Courtesy Patrol. With just thirty five men selected from 6000 applicants, the new Patrolmen arrived in Golden for training. The Patrol Board was made up of E.E. Wheeler, the Chairman of the State PUC, Charles Vail, Chief Engineer of Highways and James H. Carr, the Secretary of State. In 1935, the Colorado State Courtesy Patrol was added as the Division of Patrol, to the Division of Highways. The Patrols title was changed in 1945 to Colorado State Highway Patrol. The Patrol Act also created a Port of Entry or Welcome for inspection of trucks of Interstate Commerce. In 1936, 30 POE Officers were hired to collect road taxes which collected sum $500, 000. In 1953, a reorganization created the Department of Highways. In 1968, another name change to Highway Department happened with the subdivisions of Highway, Planning and Patrol, which the CSP fell under. In 1983, the Department of Public Safety was created and the CSP was transferred under the Director of Public Safety.

The patrol was met with opposition from the public when it was formed, as well as from other law enforcement agencies, who thought the patrol would endanger their jurisdiction.  Therefore, Colorado legislature carefully outlined the duties of the agency in the Patrol Act, which states that "it shall be their duty to promote safety, protect human life and preserve the highways of Colorado by the intelligent, courteous, and strict enforcement of the laws and regulation of this state relating to highways."  This became the motto of the Colorado State Patrol.

The notorious Ludlow Massacre near Trinidad in 1914 sullied any attempts in forming a state police. While a police organization was not involved, Colorado did not want a police force to act upon the orders of the governor, especially in a labor strike. Today, Colorado State Patrol officers are not allowed to act as guards in strikes or labor disputes.

The Colorado Rangers were founded in 1861. These officers were state officers and were known to augment local police and sheriffs. Governor William E. Sweet signed an executive order on January 29, 1923, cutting off funding and effectively disbanding the Rangers. Fulfilling a campaign promise, on April 1, 1927 Governor Billy Adams repealed the Department of Safety Act, thus officially disbanding the Colorado Rangers, and with it, all statewide law enforcement in Colorado. Colorado Rangers were subsequently reorganized as a statewide law enforcement shared reserve.

In 1915, Colorado voted to become a “dry” state to begin January 1, 1916. Stories have Adolph Coors dumping thousands of gallons of beer into Clear Creek on the first day of 1916.  National Prohibition began on January 20, 1920 as the Volstead Act/18th Amendment. Prohibition lasted in Colorado until December 5, 1933 with the repeal of Prohibition or the 21st Amendment.

With state prohibition, Colorado created Prohibition Agents to enforce state liquor laws in 1915. Most agents were local police and sheriffs deputies. In 1923, the Colorado Law Enforcement Department was created as an extension of the Prohibition Department and to assist police and sheriffs in case of emergencies. Due to questions about the Governor using Colorado officers in labor disputes, the department was downsized to a Chief (Lewis Scherf) and five agents in 1929. Members of the department were mostly Colorado Peace Officers or citizens serving in an honorary capacity. In 1933, the Law Enforcement Department was totally abolished.

The State Department of Safety was created to protect/augment military war industries in Colorado in 1917. The department was to be abolished after World War I and was folded into the Colorado Rangers.

The Motor Vehicle Department, Auto Theft and Colorado Motor Police all have their beginnings in the 1920s. All to be disbanded in 1935, with the creation of the Colorado State Highway Courtesy Patrol.

In 1935, the Colorado State Courtesy Patrol was added as the Division of Patrol, while the highway maintenance was re named Division of Highways.

In 1953, a reorganization created the Department of Highways. In 1968, another name change to Highway Department happened with the subdivisions of Highway, Planning and Patrol.

In 1983, the Department of Public Safety was created and the CSP was transferred under the Director of Public Safety.

Weapons and tools
Until the switch to auto-loading semi-automatic pistols, the CSP carried blue steel, 4-inch barreled Colt Python revolvers. CSP then went to the Smith & Wesson Model 4006 .40 S&W in a Melonite (black) finish with the agency's seal engraved in the slide. CSP troopers now carry the Smith & Wesson M&P .40.

All CSP troopers are issued an ASP baton and OC, with Tasers started being used in 2011.

Starting in 2019, all CSP troopers were issued a Sionic Patrol Rifle chambered in .223.

In 2020, the CSP transitioned to the Smith & Wesson M&P 2.0 .40.

Vehicles and aircraft 

In 2009, after many years of using Ford Crown Victoria patrol cars, the CSP began to introduce Dodge Chargers into its fleet. The CSP also uses Chevrolet Tahoes, Ford Police Interceptors (both sedan and utility models) and Chevrolet Caprices.  The Hazardous Materials and Motor Carrier Safety sections use Ford F-150 trucks.

The CSP operates five fixed wing aircraft.
 One Beechcraft King Air
 One Cessna 340
 Three Cessna 182s

The Colorado State Patrol Motor Operations unit used Harley-Davidson motorcycles up to 2010.  From 2010 to 2012 the Kawasaki Concours was phased in.  In 2015, CSP switched to the BMW R1200RTP Police motorcycle.  Motor Officers are assigned to individual field troops and ride year round.

Activities
Specific duties include:
Directing, controlling and regulating motor vehicle traffic on public roadways.
Inspecting vehicles for safety-related equipment violations.
Inspecting vehicles carrying livestock for brand inspection certificates.
Providing community education and administer safety programs to the public.
Regulating road closures for special events, inclement weather, or when necessary to prevent further injury or damage following an emergency.
Promulgating and enforcing rules and regulations for commercial motor vehicles.
Operating a statewide law enforcement telecommunications system.
Performing criminal interdiction on Colorado highways, focusing on the transport of illegal drugs.
Assisting in state homeland security efforts.
Providing emergency assistance in the event of major disasters, civil protests, or when requested by local law enforcement.

Rank structure

Commissioned officers

Non-commissioned officers

Special programs

Alive at 25
A community program designed to impact the future of traffic safety, Alive at 25 focuses educational effort to youths between the ages of 14 and 25.  Its emphasis is to identify and eliminate at-risk driving behavior.

Specialty units
CSP specialty units include:
Vehicular Crimes Unit
Aircraft Section
Canine Team (narcotic and explosive detection)
Executive Security Branch
Hazardous Materials Section
Homeland Security Section
Smuggling and Trafficking Interdiction Section
Investigative Services Section
Motor Carrier Safety Section
Motorcycle Unit
Evidence Section

Fallen troopers
Since its establishment in 1935, 30 troopers have died while on duty or while employed with the Colorado State Patrol.

Line of Duty Deaths
Struck by Vehicle/Vehicular Assault: 10
Automobile Crash: 8
Gunfire: 7
Vehicle Pursuit: 1
Motorcycle Crash: 1
Drowning: 1
Exposure to Toxins: 1
Fall: 1

See also

 Highway patrol
 List of law enforcement agencies in Colorado
 State of Colorado
 State patrol
 State police

References

External links
Colorado State Patrol website
Alive at 25 website

Organizations based in Lakewood, Colorado
State law enforcement agencies of Colorado
Government agencies established in 1935
1935 establishments in Colorado